The prosecutor's ranks in the Russian Federation are defined by the Presidential Decree of 21 November 2012 No.1563.

Shoulder marks are used as insignia.

Ranks and insignia

See also
 Special ranks in Investigative Committee of Russia
 State civilian and municipal service ranks in Russian Federation
 Diplomatic ranks in Russian Federation
 Army ranks and insignia of the Russian Federation
 Naval ranks and insignia of the Russian Federation

References

Law enforcement service ranks in the Russian Federation